Abu'l-Fadl al-Isfahani, also known as the Isfahani Mahdi, was a young Persian man who in 931 CE was declared to be "God incarnate" by the Qarmatian leader of Bahrayn, Abu Tahir al-Jannabi. This new apocalyptic leader, however, caused great disruption by rejecting traditional aspects of Islam, and promoting ties to Zoroastrianism.

Abu Tahir thought that he had identified the Mahdi as a young Persian prisoner from Isfahan by the name of Abu'l-Fadl al-Isfahani, who claimed to be a descendant of the Sassanid Persian kings. Al-Isfahani had been brought back to Bahrayn from the Qarmatians' raid into Iraq in 928. In 931, Abu Tahir turned over the state to this Mahdi-Caliph, said in fact to be a Zoroastrian revivalist with anti-Arab sentiments. He reinstituted the veneration of fire and engaged in burning of religious books during an eighty-day rule. Isfahani also is though to have some links with established Zoroastrian orthodoxy as the high priest of the Zoroastrians. Esfandiar Adarbad was executed by the Abbasid Caliph after being accused of complicity with Abu Tahir. His reign culminated in the execution of members of Bahrayn's notable families, including members of Abu Tahir's family. Abu Tahir's mother conspired to get rid of Abu'l-Fadl; she faked her death and sent a messenger to call the Mahdi to resurrect her. When he refused, he was exposed as being a normal human, and Abu Tahir's brother Sa'id killed Abu'l-Fadl after the Mahdi had reigned for only eighty days. Other accounts say fearing for his own life, Abu Tahir announced that he had been wrong and denounced the al-Isfahani as a false Mahdi. Begging forgiveness from the other notables, Abu Tahir had him executed.

References

Sources
 
 
 
 
 

Qarmatians
931 deaths
Medieval Bahraini people
Iranian Zoroastrians
10th-century Iranian people
Mahdism